Equity feminism is a form of liberal feminism that advocates the state's equal treatment of women and men. Equity ensures equality between everyone without challenging inequalities perpetuated by employers, educational and religious institutions, and other elements of society. The concept has been discussed since the 1980s. Equity feminism has been defined and classified as a kind of classically liberal or libertarian feminism, in contrast with social feminism, difference feminism, gender feminism, and equality feminism.

Overview
The Stanford Encyclopedia of Philosophy refers to Wendy McElroy, Joan Kennedy Taylor, Cathy Young, Rita Simon, Katie Roiphe, Diana Furchtgott-Roth, Christine Stolba, and Christina Hoff Sommers as equity feminists. Camille Paglia also describes herself as an equity feminist. Christina Sommers, in particular, explored the topic of equity feminism in her book Who Stole Feminism? In this text, Sommers summarizes how the aim of equity feminism is to attain economic, educational, and political equality of opportunity. Sommers claims that feminists are separated between two categories: equity feminists and gender feminists. She states that the difference between gender feminists and equity feminists is that gender feminists aim to change, or question, traditional gender roles. Whereas equity feminists want equal treatment and rights.

Steven Pinker, an evolutionary and cognitive psychologist, linguist, and popular science author, identifies himself as an equity feminist, which he defines as "a moral doctrine about equal treatment that makes no commitments regarding open empirical issues in psychology or biology".

In the United States, Alice Paul and Crystal Eastman, two women in the National Women's Party, were involved in drafting the Equal Rights Amendment, with the goal of achieving "constitutional protections from discrimination" for all women.

Distinctions have been made between conservative and radical forms of equity feminism. Many young conservative women have accepted equity feminism.

The "Gender Equity Starts in the Home" article uncovers one of the many reasons equity is not being enforced in the home. Jack Koban contributes to this, as being a stay at home dad, while his wife works as a medicine physician. He mentions how him and his wife have reached a work-life balance by helping each other at work and at home. This example brings equity in the home and not only is it helping Koban and his wife successful in their relationship, but also teaches their kids equity at an early age.

Theorists 
Anne-Marie Kinahan claims that most American women look to a kind of feminism whose main goal is equity. Louis Schubert et al. claims "principles of equity feminism remain in the vision of the vast majority of women in the United States".

United States 

The Equal Rights Amendment was proposed originally in 1923 by the National Women's Party to congress before being approved by the U.S. House of Representatives in March 1972 that would give both women and men the constitutional right to equity.

Equity in feminism is a branch of liberal feminism that creates a political stance assuring women's rights within or under the law. The battle for equity becomes political as many argue women and other groups who are considered oppressed are denied the same opportunities of cis-gender white males. Since the rejection of the ERA in 1972, the fight for equity has continued to grow in America and pushed for new laws that would protect women as it would have. Equity in feminism is important because it notes that women deserve the same rights. If there is no political push for a feminist equitable society, it would create a statement that women are lesser than men and don't deserve the same treatment regardless of education or social class.

The Equal Rights Amendment guarantees equal rights for all American citizens. This would assure to dispute any distinctions between sexes.

Europe 
In many respects, Europe has a more progressive stance than the United States when it comes to feminist and gender equity support. Organizations in Europe were made to promote not only equality and equity, but they also aimed to promote diversity while being an ally for women across the continent. Compared to the European Union, the lack of publicly identified feminists in the Americas poses some political challenges for the movement. Integrating feminists' methods into institutions is how European countries have been able to advance the interests of equity and feminism.

See also
First-wave feminism
Liberal feminism
Libertarian feminism
Equality feminism
Liberal Women (Germany)

References

Liberal feminism
Classical liberalism